is a Japanese TV actress and announcer who is represented by the talent agency DeJaneiro.

Filmography

Television and radio

References

External links
Official profile 

Japanese announcers
1982 births
Living people
People from Tokyo
Keio University alumni